Howley or Howly may refer to:

People
Chuck Howley (born 1936), former American football player
Dan Howley (1885-1944), American baseball player nicknamed "Dapper Dan"
Frank L. Howley (1903-1993), American general and former commandant, U.S. sector of Berlin
James Patrick Howley (1847-1918), Canadian naturalist
Joe Howley (fl. 1916–1920), Sinn Féin captain
Kerry Howley (born 1981), American magazine editor
Kevin Howley (1924–1997), English football referee
Michael Francis Howley (1843-1914), Roman Catholic priest and Archbishop of St. John's, Newfoundland
Orlando Martinez Howley (1944-1975), Dominican Republic journalist
Paul Howley (born 1955), founder and owner of That's Entertainment comics and collectible
Richard Howly (1740–1784), American planter and lawyer
Rob Howley (born 1970), Welsh rugby player
William Howley (1766-1848), Archbishop of Canterbury
Chris Howley (born 1968), Cast of Ghost Chasers TV show

Places 
 Howley, Gloucestershire, England, UK
 Howley, Newfoundland and Labrador, Canada
 Howley, Somerset, a location in England, UK
 Howley, Warrington, near Latchford, England, UK
 Howly, Barpeta district, Assam, India

Other 
 Howley Hall, Batley, West Yorkshire, England

Disambiguation pages with surname-holder lists